Badran Mohammad Al-Shaqran (born 19 January 1974) is a retired Jordanian professional footballer. He was nicknamed "Sinbad of Jordanian football".

Retirement
On 13 July 2011, Jordan played a friendly match against Saudi Arabia to mark Badran's retirement in playing football. After playing the first 5 minutes of the match, Badran gave the captain armband to his teammate Bashar Bani Yaseen as well as his #20 jersey shirt to his younger teammate from Al-Ramtha  Hamza Al-Dardour and left the field.

Honors and Participation in International Tournaments

In AFC Asian Cups 
2004 Asian Cup

In Pan Arab Games 
1997 Pan Arab Games
1999 Pan Arab Games

In Arab Nations Cup 
1998 Arab Nations Cup
2002 Arab Nations Cup

In WAFF Championships 
2000 WAFF Championship
2002 WAFF Championship
2004 WAFF Championship

International goals

References

 Green Saudis Defeat the Jordanians During the Mark of Al-Shagran's Retirement
alramtha.net

External links
 
 

1974 births
Living people
Jordanian footballers
Jordan international footballers
Jordanian expatriate footballers
Russian Premier League players
Jordanian expatriate sportspeople in Bahrain
al-Ramtha SC players
FC KAMAZ Naberezhnye Chelny players
Al-Muharraq SC players
Al-Wathba SC players
Ittihad Al-Ramtha players
Expatriate footballers in Bahrain
Expatriate footballers in Syria
Jordanian expatriate sportspeople in Russia
2004 AFC Asian Cup players
Association football forwards
Syrian Premier League players